Christope Edaleine (born 1 November 1979 in Annonay, Ardèche) is a French former professional road bicycle racer. His riding career ended when  did not renew his contract at the end of the 2008 season.

In 2012 he directed a mixed team that won the team classification in the Tour Cycliste Féminin International de l'Ardèche and included Emma Pooley who won the general classification.

Major results

2001
1st  Overall Tour des Pays de Savoie
1st Mountains classification Étoile de Bessèges
5th Druivenkoers Overijse
5th Overall Tour de la Somme
2002
6th Tro-Bro Léon
7th Overall Bayern Rundfahrt
2003
1st Stage 7 Tour de l'Avenir
6th GP de Villers-Cotterêts
8th GP de Denain
10th Overall Grote Prijs Erik Breukink
2007
9th Overall Tour du Poitou Charentes et de la Vienne
10th Tour du Doubs

References

External links 
Personal website 
Profile at Crédit Agricole official website 

1979 births
Living people
People from Annonay
French male cyclists
Sportspeople from Ardèche
Cyclists from Auvergne-Rhône-Alpes